Prądzona  is a village in Gmina Lipnica, Bytów County, Pomeranian Voivodeship, in northern Poland.

From 1975 to 1998 the village was in Słupsk Voivodeship.

It had a population of 159 in 2006.

References

Map of the Gmina Lipnica

Villages in Bytów County